Ken Shine (born 22 November 1947) is a former head coach of the South Sydney Rabbitohs in the National Rugby League.

Coaching career
Shine replaced coach Bob McCarthy after McCarthy stepped down from the coaching role in Round 3 of the 1994 season.

At the time, Souths had just come off a strong pre season where they defeated the Brisbane Broncos 27–26 in a huge upset to win the Tooheys Challenge Cup.

In Shine's first season at coach, he took Souths on a seven-game winning streak and the club looked on track to qualify for the finals for the first time since their minor premiership win in 1989, but a major drop in form saw Souths lose eight of their last nine games.

Shine coached Souths up until the end of 1997 season until he was replaced by former North Sydney Bears coach Steve Martin.

References

Living people
Australian rugby league coaches
South Sydney Rabbitohs coaches
1947 births